Ola Johansson may refer to:
 Ola Johansson (footballer)
 Ola Johansson (politician)